Alan B. Handler (born July 20, 1931) served as a New Jersey Supreme Court Justice from 1977 until 1999.

Early life

Handler was born in Newark, New Jersey, in 1931. He attended Newark Academy and then Princeton University, graduating with a B.A. degree from the Woodrow Wilson School of Public and International Affairs in 1953. After receiving an LL.B. degree from Harvard Law School in 1956, he entered private legal practice in Newark.

Career

Handler served in the Office of the New Jersey Attorney General as First Assistant Attorney General from 1961 until 1964 and as First Assistant Attorney General from 1964 to 1968. He was appointed to the New Jersey Superior Court in 1968 by Governor Richard J. Hughes. He was assigned to the Appellate Division in 1973.

In 1976 he resigned from the bench to serve as counsel to Governor Brendan Byrne. In March 1977, he was appointed as Associate Justice of the New Jersey Supreme Court.

Handler retired from the court in September 1999. He is currently Of Counsel at the Woodbridge, New Jersey, firm Wilentz, Goldman & Spitzer.

Family

Handler resides in Delaware Township in Hunterdon County, New Jersey, and was predeceased by his wife, the former Rose Marie Kudroch, in 2011. He has three daughters, Julia, Carolyn, and Nancy Handler; Carolyn is Counsel at the firm of Patterson Belknap Webb & Tyler. His stepdaughter, Kara Foxe, is a prosecutor in Middlesex County, and his stepson, Sean Foxe, retired as a prosecutor in Hunterdon County.

References

1931 births
New Jersey lawyers
American jurists
Living people
Justices of the Supreme Court of New Jersey
Princeton School of Public and International Affairs alumni
Harvard Law School alumni
Newark Academy alumni
People from Delaware Township, Hunterdon County, New Jersey
Politicians from Newark, New Jersey
Lawyers from Newark, New Jersey